San Fermín or San Fermin may refer to:
 Festival of San Fermín, historically rooted celebration held annually in the city of Pamplona, Navarre 
 San Fermín de los Navarros, church located in Madrid, Spain
 San Fermín earthquake, struck the island of Puerto Rico in 1918
 San Fermín-Orcasur, station of the Madrid Metro
 San Fermín (Madrid), ward of Madrid belonging to the district of Usera
 San Fermin (album), self-titled debut album by chamber pop collective San Fermin
 San Fermin (band), American indie rock collective

See also
 Fermín (disambiguation)